Legislative elections were held in Åland on 18 October 2015, alongside elections for sixteen municipal councils: Mariehamn town, nine rural socken on the main island, Fasta Åland, and six skerries socken.

Electoral system
The 30 members of the Parliament of Åland were elected by proportional representation, with seats allocated using the d'Hondt method.

Campaign
Seven parties contested the legislative elections, and the municipal elections in most municipalities, although the Liberals for Åland will be the only party to contest all municipalities.

During the 2011–2015 parliamentary term the four MPs from the independent centre-right party Non-aligned Coalition (ObS) merged into the conservative Moderates to become Moderate Coalition for Åland, but the rump of ObS will contest the 2015 elections, and has taken a critical stance against Syrian refugees with a "no to refugees" campaign movie. Another anti-refugee list, the populist Ålandic Democracy, which is led by Stephan Toivonen and also supports equal rights for Finnish speakers, will also be on the ballot.

The regionalist and centrist Åland Centre has called for Åland to establish its own foreign ministry and for the Ålandic healthcare board being appointed solely by the governing coalition rather than the existing system of being proportionally divided between parties.

Other parties contesting the elections were the Åland Social Democrats, the social-liberal centre-right Liberals for Åland, the centrist and separatist Future of Åland.

Opinion polls

Results

References

External links
Ålandic Electoral Commission

Elections in Åland
Aland
October 2015 events in Europe